The Old Dominion Monarchs football statistical leaders are individual statistical leaders of the Old Dominion Monarchs football program in various categories, including passing, rushing, receiving, total offense, defensive stats, and kicking. Within those areas, the lists identify single-game, single-season, and career leaders. The Monarchs represent Old Dominion University in the NCAA Division I FBS Sun Belt Conference.

Although Old Dominion previously competed in intercollegiate football from 1930 to 1941 as the Norfolk Division of William & Mary, the school's official record book only includes records from after the program's reestablishment in 2009, as records from so long ago are incomplete or unavailable.

This means that the Monarchs' official records only include 13 complete seasons, so the entries are often much smaller than would typically be seen on college football programs' top 10 lists. However, quarterback Taylor Heinicke's 14,939 passing yards is seventh in college football history.

These lists are updated through the 2021 season.

Passing

Passing yards

Passing touchdowns

Rushing

Rushing yards

Rushing touchdowns

Receiving

Receptions

Receiving yards

Receiving touchdowns

Total offense
Total offense is the sum of passing and rushing statistics. It does not include receiving or returns.

Total offense yards

Total touchdowns

Defense

Interceptions

Tackles

Sacks

Kicking

Field goals made

Field goal percentage

References

Old Dominion